The 2017 West Virginia Mountaineers football team represented West Virginia University in the 2017 NCAA Division I FBS football season. The Mountaineers played their home games at the Mountaineer Field at Milan Puskar Stadium, in Morgantown, West Virginia, and competed in the Big 12 Conference. They were led by seventh-year head coach Dana Holgorsen. They finished the season 7–6, 5–4 in Big 12 play to finish in a four-way tie for fourth place. They were invited to the Heart of Dallas Bowl where they lost to Utah.

Previous season 
The Mountaineers finished the 2016 season 10–3, 7–2 in Big 12 play to finished in a tie for second place. They received an invitation to the Russell Athletic Bowl where they lost Miami.

Preseason

Big 12 Media poll
The 2017 Big 12 media days were held July 17–18, 2017 in Frisco, Texas. In the Big 12 preseason media poll, West Virginia was predicted to finish sixth in the standings.

Coaching staff

Schedule
West Virginia announced its 2017 football schedule on December 13, 2016. The 2017 schedule consists of six home, five away, and one neutral site game in the regular season. The Mountaineers will host Big 12 foes Iowa State, Oklahoma State, Texas, and Texas Tech, and will travel to Baylor, Kansas, Kansas State, Oklahoma, and TCU.

The Mountaineers will host two of the three non-conference opponents, Delaware State from the Mid-Eastern Athletic Conference and East Carolina from the American Athletic Conference and travel to Landover, Maryland to face Virginia Tech.

Schedule Source:

Rankings

References

West Virginia
West Virginia Mountaineers football seasons
West Virginia Mountaineers football